Kinlochbervie High School is a secondary school in Kinlochbervie, in the county of Sutherland in the northwest of Scotland.

The school is attended by 41 pupils from a catchment area that extends from Scourie to Durness.
Before the school opened in 1995, pupils attended Golspie High School as weekly boarders.

Associated schools
Primary schools at Durness, Kinlochbervie and Scourie send pupils to Kinlochbervie.

Footnotes

External links
 School website
Kinlochbervie's page on Scottish Schools Online

Secondary schools in Sutherland
Educational institutions established in 1995
1995 establishments in Scotland